Wolfe Mays (1912 – 21 January 2005) was a British philosopher. He was the founder of British Society for Phenomenology and the editor of its journal.
Mays is known for his efforts for introducing phenomenology in England. He taught at the University of Manchester from 1946 until his retirement in 1979. His students included Kevin Mulligan,  Peter Simons, and  Barry Smith.

References

20th-century British philosophers
Phenomenologists
Continental philosophers
Philosophy academics
Philosophy journal editors
1912 births
2005 deaths
Alumni of the University of Cambridge
Academics of the University of Manchester
Alumni of the University of Oxford